Chataway is a surname, and may refer to:

 Christopher Chataway (1931–2014) British runner and politician
 Gertrude Chataway (1866–1951), friend of the author Lewis Carroll
 James Chataway (1852–1901), Australian politician
 John Chataway (1947–2004), Canadian politician
 Thomas Drinkwater Chataway (1864–1925), Australian politician, brother of Gertrude and James

See also
 Chattaway